ITA Award for Best Actress – Drama (also known as Best Actress Jury) is an award given by Indian Television Academy as a part of its annual event.

Winners and nominations

2000s

2010s

2020s

See also 
ITA Award for Best Actor – Drama
ITA Award for Best Serial – Drama

References

External links
 Indian Television Academy Awards

Film awards for lead actress
Awards established in 2001
Actress